Urbino (Romagnol: Urbìn) is a walled city in the Marche region of Italy, south-west of Pesaro, a World Heritage Site notable for a remarkable historical legacy of independent Renaissance culture, especially under the patronage of Federico da Montefeltro, duke of Urbino from 1444 to 1482. The town, nestled on a high sloping hillside, retains much of its picturesque medieval aspect. It hosts the University of Urbino, founded in 1506, and is the seat of the Archbishop of Urbino. Its best-known architectural piece is the Palazzo Ducale, rebuilt by Luciano Laurana.

Geography 
The city lies in a hilly region, at the foothills of the Northern Apennines and the Tuscan-Romagnolo Apennines. It is within the southern area of Montefeltro, an area classified as medium-high seismic risk. In the database of earthquakes developed by the National Institute of Geophysics and Volcanology, nearly 65 seismic events have affected the town of Urbino between 26 March 1511 and 26 March 1998. They include 24 April 1741, when the shocks were stronger than VIII on the Mercalli intensity scale, with an epicenter in Fabriano (where it reached 6.08 on the moment magnitude scale).

History

Origins and Middle Ages 
The originally modest Roman town of Urbinum Mataurense ("the little city on the river Mataurus") became an important strategic stronghold during the Gothic Wars of the 6th century. In 538, it was captured from the Ostrogoths by the Byzantine general Belisarius, and is frequently mentioned by the historian Procopius.

Pepin the Short (King of the Franks) presented Urbino to the Papacy in 754–56. Its commune later had some independence until around 1200, when it came into the possession of the House of Montefeltro. These noblemen had no direct authority over the commune; however, they could pressure it to elect them to the position of podestà. Bonconte di Montefeltro obtained this title in 1213: Urbino's population rebelled and formed an alliance with the independent commune of Rimini (1228), finally regaining independence in 1234. Eventually, though, the Montefeltro noblemen took control once more, and held it until 1508. In the struggles between the Guelphs and Ghibellines, when factions supported either the Papacy or the Holy Roman Empire respectively, the 13th and 14th century Montefeltro lords of Urbino were leaders of the Ghibellines of the Marche and in the Romagna region.

Period of Federico da Montefeltro 
The most famous member of the Montefeltro family, Federico da Montefeltro, ruled as Duke of Urbino from 1444 to 1482. He was a very successful condottiere, a skillful diplomat and an enthusiastic patron of art and literature. He rose to power in 1444 as the son of Guidantonio, after a conspiracy and the murder of the legitimate heir Oddantonio, hated for his "unbridled lust" and excessive taxes.

Federico began a reorganization of the state, which also included a restructuring of the city according to a modern conception - comfortable, efficient and beautiful.

At his court, Piero della Francesca wrote on the science of perspective, Francesco di Giorgio Martini wrote his Trattato di architettura (Treatise on Architecture) and Raphael's father, Giovanni Santi, wrote his poetical account of the chief artists of his time. Federico's brilliant court, according to the descriptions in Baldassare Castiglione's Il Cortegiano (The Book of the Courtier, published in 1528), set standards of what would characterize a modern European "gentleman" for centuries to come.

Cesare Borgia and the years of the Duchy Della Rovere 
Cesare Borgia dispossessed Guidobaldo da Montefeltro, Duke of Urbino, and Elisabetta Gonzaga in 1502, with the complicity of his father, Pope Alexander VI. After the attempt of Pope Leo X to appoint a young Medici as duke, thwarted by the early death of Lorenzo II de Medici in 1519, Urbino was part of the Papal States, under the dynasty of the dukes Della Rovere (1508–1631). They moved the court to the city of Pesaro in 1523 and Urbino began a slow decline that would continue until the last decades of the seventeenth century.

Annexation by the Papal States 
In 1626, Pope Urban VIII definitively incorporated the Duchy into the papal dominions, the gift of the last Della Rovere duke, in retirement after the assassination of his heir, to be governed by the archbishop. The state was ruled thereafter by a papal legate, generally belonging to high ecclesiastical hierarchy. Following the annexation of the duchy by the Papal States, the rich artistic heritage (including furniture) of the Ducal Palace went to form, for the most part, the dowry of the last direct descendant of the Della Rovere, Vittoria della Rovere, who married Ferdinand II de Medici. These works went on to form the core of the future Uffizi Gallery. Among the works that went to Florence is the diptych of the Dukes of Urbino by Piero della Francesca. Other works of the Ducal Palace were brought to Rome, such as the Barberini Ex Tables of Fra Carnevale and the famous library, absorbed entirely by the Vatican Library in 1657.

The Albani and the French occupation 
The eighteenth century opened with the election to the papacy (1701) of Cardinal Giovan Francesco Albani Urbino, under the name of Clement XI. This was a windfall for the city and was its last great era, especially in terms of arts and culture, thanks to funding by Pope Albani and his family. Major renovation of several buildings, churches and monasteries took place; such as Palazzo Albani, part of the façade of the Town Hall, the Archbishop's Palace, the Chapel Albani (inside the convent of St. Francis), Saint Joseph's Oratory, and the internal structure of the churches of San Francesco, San Domenico and Saint Augustine. In addition, due to the patronage of the Pope and of his family, the Duomo di Urbino received many improvements (like the new altar) as did other religious institutions in the city. From July 1717 to November 1718 Urbino hosted the court of James Stuart the exiled pretender to the British throne, who had the strong backing of the Papacy.

This new age of splendor for the city ended with the death of Clement XI in 1721, placing the city in a long decline that has continued to the present day. After the Pope's death, the Albani family remained the main patron of the most significant works until the first half of the nineteenth century.

In 1789, the collapse of the Cathedral dome following a massive earthquake led to the total renovation of the church.

Between 1797 and 1800 the city was occupied by French troops, like much of northern and central Italy. During the French occupation Urbino and its territory suffered from the acquisitions of important works of art by the French, which were moved to Paris or Milan, in the nascent galleries of the Louvre and Brera. This event was a further cause of the impoverished local artistic heritage, already tried by the loss of the works following the devolution of the duchy in the seventeenth century.

Redevelopment of the nineteenth century 
The century opened with the consecration in 1809 of the new Duomo di Urbino, as designed by the architect Giuseppe Valadier, who restored the city's Montefeltro-era buildings, such as the old Seminary, adjacent to the church of St. Sergius, now partly occupied by the Hotel Raffaello.

Following the construction of the New Palace of Alban (1831), designed by architect Peter Ghinelli, which gave rise to the present Piazza della Repubblica that went on to form the first part of the future Corso Garibaldi, the city experienced a number of urban improvements designed to change the face of the city. From the construction of the Sanzio theater (1845–53) came the final realization of Corso Garibaldi, with a covered walkway on the downhill side to that ensure theater-goers were sheltered from rain and snow on their walk to the Piazza della Repubblica, with construction that lasted until the early part of the twentieth century. In addition, another important change was the destruction, in 1868, of a part of the walls to create a customs barrier, called Porta Nuova or barrier Margherita (in honor of Princess Margaret of Savoy), which was necessitated by a new road that ran along a stretch of the walls and was connected to Corso Garibaldi. This resulted in a new urban layout with the large spit of land below the Doge's Palace incorporated into the city, called the Pincio.

These urban transformations brought about a change in access to the city. Instead of passing through narrow, winding streets, through the gates of the walls, now one could enter through the Porta Nuova in an easier and convenient way to arrive in the present Piazza della Repubblica and the Palazzo Ducale (the city center).

This urban renewal reflected many of the ideas of Fulvio Corboli but its design was largely done by the architect Vincenzo Ghinelli.

Unification of Italy 
On 8 September 1860 the Piedmontese troops entered Urbino from Port Saint Lucia, forcing the surrender of the last resistance of the papal army under the portico of the childhood house of Raphael. But it was not until 29 September, with the capture of Ancona, that the total conquest of the Marche region was completed by the Piedmont army.

Between 4 and 5 November, the plebiscite was held for the annexation of the Marche to the Kingdom of Sardinia, which ended with 133,783 votes in favor, 260 votes against and 1,212 invalid ballots. In the province of Urbino (excluding the territory of Pesaro) the count was 21,111 for and 365 against with 29 invalid ballots. Subsequently, on 10 November, the Marche was included in the Statuto Albertino, and then, on 17 December, it was made official with the issuance of a royal decree.

The new government began the confiscation of various ecclesiastical goods, including good part of the convent of San Francisco (where a part of a botanical garden, designed by Vincenzo Ghinelli, was located), the monastery of Santa Chiara, that of San Girolamo, and many others.

First half of the twentieth century 
The century began as had the previous one. This period of quiet lasted for almost the entire first half of the twentieth century, with no particular significant events. In this period, the Scuola del Libro (Istituto per la Decorazione e l'Illustrazione del Libro) was founded and expressed considerable talent both nationally and internationally. In addition to the artistic development from the Scuola del Libro, Urbino also began to grow as a university town, with the elevation to university faculty of nineteenth-century School of Pharmacy and the birth of the department of Education (approximately 1934). Due to these changes in the University, an increase in the student population led to housing shortages that highlighted the state of total unpreparedness of the city, so much that for the first time many students were housed in the homes of private citizens. The problem was partly solved with the establishment of the male boarding school "Raphael" at the beginning of the century, and the female boarding school "Laura Battiferri" in approximately 1926. 
This period was dominated by great events of national and international history, which inevitably were expressed in Urbino. The period of the fascist dictatorship left its mark on the city, especially from an architectural point of view, with a fascist elementary school "Giovanni Pascoli" (1932) built on the ancient Garden of Saint Lucia (part of the duke's private gardens), the restoration of the palace-Mauruzi Gherardi, then the seat of the court, as well as the Student House, to compensate for the shortage of accommodation as a result of the large increase in university population and housing for the maimed and disabled civilians.

In 1938, the city was designated as the headquarters for the fledgling Soprintendenza alle Gallerie e alle Opere d'Arte delle Marche, roughly translated as the Organization of Galleries and Works of Art of the Marche.

With the outbreak of World War II the city suffered no bombing, thanks to the large red cross painted on the roof of the Ducal Palace and an agreement between the Germans and the Allies. Only towards the end of the war did the retreating German troops try to destroy all the ramparts of the walls, but luckily the mines were tampered with by the workers the Germans had hired from Urbino. During the retreat, the German army isolated the city with the destruction of rail and road links. In addition, the Germans planned to blow up a tunnel, then under construction, between Urbino and the parish of Schieti that was being used by the Nazis to store weapons. Because of its location at the foot of the historic center, the population feared that an explosion would lead to the destruction of the village above, but this did not happen. During the Second World War, the then Superintendent of the Galleries and Works of Art in Urbino in the Marche Pasquale Rotondi  secretly placed around 10,000 priceless works (including those of Giorgione, Piero della Francesca, Paolo Uccello, Titian, Mantegna, Raphael and many more, from all the major museums in Italy) that were being stolen by the Nazis into the Rock of Sassocorvaro. His actions gained worldwide recognition and to this day the Rock of Sassocorvaro is known as the “Ark of Art”.

Urbino was liberated from the Nazi occupation on 28 August 1944, thanks to the British V Corps, Polish troops, and the heroic actions of partisan groups in the area. Some of the members of these partisan groups were captured by the Nazis and executed on the current Punto Panoramica, where memorials are now placed celebrating their sacrifice.

Urbino and De Carlo 
The second half of the twentieth century was characterized in Urbino by the cooperation with the major public institutions (the University and the City) by the architect Giancarlo De Carlo. This relationship began in 1956 when Carlo Bo, former rector of the University, commissioned from De Carlo the internal renovation project of Montefeltro- Bonaventure building, headquarters of the University. Immediately after that, the Genoese architect was commissioned by the City to prepare the General Plan (1958–64) aimed at the recovery of the historical center, which had been in poor condition and was in danger of losing several neighborhoods including the Palazzo Ducale to the land subsidence below. This problem was solved thanks to state funding derived from two special laws enacted for the city (in 1968 and in 1982 ).

Subsequently, De Carlo realized several projects for the university including the college's dormitories, near the Capuchin church outside the city center, an interesting example of how architecture can merge with the surrounding landscape. He also completed projects like the construction of the department of Magisterium (1968–76), the restructuring of the department of Law ( 1966–68 ) and the Battiferri building (1986–99) for the department of Economics. They are three significant examples of the inclusion of a contemporary architecture in an ancient surrounding, and are still studied today.

The seventies were marked by a collaboration with the Municipality for a project called Operation Mercatale (1969–72), which included the construction of a multi-story underground car park under Torricini's famous Ducal Palace and the restoration of the helical ramp under the theater by Francesco di Giorgio Martini (1971–75), in collaboration with the City. They also developed the project of renovation of the Sanzio theater (1977–82) and the renovation project, much discussed, of the ancient Ducal Stables. In addition, thanks to the close relationship with De Carlo, the city has hosted twice (1976–81, and 1992–93) the laboratories of the ILAUD, founded and directed by the Genoese architect.
 
One of the last of De Carlo actions was the preparation, between 1989 and 1994, of the New General Plan.

Maiolica 

The clay earth of Urbino, which still supports industrial brickworks, supplied a cluster of earthenware manufactories (botteghe) making the tin-glazed pottery known as maiolica.  Simple local wares were being made in the 15th century at Urbino, but after 1520 the Della Rovere dukes, Francesco Maria I della Rovere and his successor Guidobaldo II, encouraged the industry, which exported wares throughout Italy, first in a manner called istoriato using engravings after Mannerist painters, then in a style of light arabesques and grottesche after the manner of Raphael's stanze at the Vatican.  Other centers of 16th century wares in the Duchy of Urbino were at Gubbio and Castel Durante. The great name in Urbino majolica was that of Nicolo Pillipario's son Guido Fontana.

Main attractions

Palaces and public buildings 
 The main attraction of Urbino is the Palazzo Ducale, begun in the second half of the 15th century by Federico II da Montefeltro. It houses the Galleria Nazionale delle Marche, one of the most important collections of Renaissance paintings in the world.
 Other buildings include Palazzo Albani (17th century), Palazzo Odasi and Palazzo Passionei.
 The Albornoz Fortress (known locally as La Fortezza), built by the eponymous Papal legate in the 14th century. In 1507-1511, when the Della Rovere added a new series of walls to the city, the rock was enclosed in them. It is now a public park.
 Raphael's house and monument (1897).

Churches 
 Duomo: the Cathedral of Urbino was founded in 1021 atop a 6th-century religious edifice. Federico II commissioned the design from the architect Francesco di Giorgio Martini, who also designed the Ducal Palace. Finished in 1604, the Duomo had a simple plan with a nave and two aisles, and was destroyed by an earthquake in 1789. The church was rebuilt in Neoclassic style by the architect Giuseppe Valadier, with work completed in 1801. The new church has a soaring dome, and houses a St Sebastian (1557), an Assumption (1701) by Maratta, and a famous Last Supper (1603–1608) by Federico Barocci.
 Sant'Agostino: the church was built in 13th-century Romanesque style, but largely modified in following centuries. The façade has a late-14th century almond portal in Gothic-Romanesque style, while the interior is greatly decorated. It houses a carved choir from the 16th century, created for the marriage of Costanzo Sforza and Camilla of Aragona. The bell tower is from the 15th century.
 San Francesco: This 14th-century church was originally a Gothic-Romanesque edifice, but an 18th-century restoration has left only the portico and the bell tower. The interior has a nave and two aisles, and houses the Pardon of St Francis, a 15th-century work by Barocci.
 Oratory of San Giovanni Battista: the oratory has 15th-century frescoes by Lorenzo Salimbeni
 Oratory of San Giuseppe (early 16th century), composed of two chapels: one of which contains a 16th-century stucco presepio or Nativity scene by Federico Brandani with highly naturalistic, life-size figures.
San Bernardino: church outside the city center, housing the tombs of the Dukes of Urbino.

Other points of interest 
 Orto Botanico "Pierina Scaramella", a botanical garden.
 University of Urbino, housed in various old and new buildings within the city centre.

Notable people 
 Battista Malatesta (1384–1448), Renaissance poet
 Bernardino Baldi, mathematician and writer
 Clorinda Corradi, opera singer (1804–77)
 Crispino Agostinucci, bishop of Montefeltro
 Donato Bramante. He was born nearby, and witnessed Laurana's work going up while he was a youth.
 Elisabetta Gonzaga, Duchess of Urbino (1471–1526)
 Federico Barocci, painter
 Federico III da Montefeltro, Duke of Urbino, medieval condottiere and patron of the arts
 Federico Zuccari and Taddeo Zuccari, painters. They were born nearby.
 Fernando Aiuti (1935–2019), immunologist
 Francesco Puccinotti (1794–1872), pathologist
 Giovanni Francesco Albani, Pope Clement XI
 Giovanni Pelingotto (1240–1304), Catholic, Secular Franciscan Order member
 Giovanni Santi, painter and poet, father of Raphael. He was born nearby.
 Guidobaldo II della Rovere, Duke of Urbino. He commissioned the Venus of Urbino painting.
 Marica Branchesi, astrophysicist
 Muzio Oddi (1569–1639), mathematician, architect, military engineer and writer
 Ottaviano Petrucci, inventor of the music print with movable type. He was born nearby.
 Paolo Volponi (1924–94), writer and poet
 Polydore Vergil or Virgil, chronicler in England
 Raffaello Carboni, writer
 Raphael Gualazzi, jazz pianist and singer, runner-up in the 2011 Eurovision Song Contest
 Raphael, painter. His family's house is a museum-shrine.
 Stefano Sensi, association football player
 Umberto Piersanti, poet and writer
 Valentino Rossi, multiple MotoGP World Champion

See also 
 Archdiocese of Urbino-Urbania-Sant'Angelo in Vado
 Dukes of Urbino

References

Sources

Further reading

External links 

 Official website of Urbino
 Urbino e Provincia

 
Capitals of former nations
Cities and towns in the Marche
Hilltowns in the Marche
Renaissance architecture in le Marche
World Heritage Sites in Italy